Short Heath is an area of Birmingham, England near to Erdington. The area's postcode is B23.

Features 
Short Heath Primary School
Short Heath Park

External links
The Goosemoor Lane area of Short Heath
1890 Ordnance Survey map of Short Heath

Areas of Birmingham, West Midlands
Erdington